FC Aruan Nartkala was a Russian football team from Nartkala. It played professionally from 1995 to 2002. Their best result was 9th place in Zone South of the Russian Second Division in 2000.

Team name history
 1995 FC Spartak-2 Nartkala
 1996–2002 FC Nart Nartkala
 2003–2006 FC Aruan Nartkala

External links
  Team history at KLISF

Association football clubs established in 1995
Association football clubs disestablished in 2007
Defunct football clubs in Russia
Sport in Kabardino-Balkaria
1995 establishments in Russia
2007 disestablishments in Russia